David Kolomatis (born February 25, 1989) is an American former professional ice hockey player. He most recently played under contract to the Manchester Monarchs of the ECHL. He was originally selected by the Los Angeles Kings in the 5th round (126th overall) of the 2009 NHL Entry Draft.

Playing career
Kolomatis spent four seasons with the Los Angeles Kings AHL affiliate, the Manchester Monarchs before leaving as a free agent to sign a one-year, two way contract with the Washington Capitals on July 5, 2013. In his only season within the Capitals organization in 2013–14, Kolomatis was assigned to their AHL affiliate, the Hershey Bears, scoring 30 points in 61 games.

On July 25, 2014, Kolomatis signed as a free agent abroad in Finland on a one-year contract with Tappara of the Liiga. In his single season abroad in 2014–15, Kolomatis produced just 1 goal and 12 points in 45 games with Tappara.

He returned the following season within the Los Angeles Kings affiliation, signing a one-year deal with newly re-birthed ECHL affiliate, the Manchester Monarchs on October 2, 2015. Kolomatis captained the Monarchs in the 2015–16 season with 17 points in 35 games before he was loaned to AHL club, the Toronto Marlies. He was later signed to stay for the remainder of the season with the Marlies, appearing in 23 games.

In the off-season, Kolomatis opted to return for a sixth season in Manchester, signing a new one-year deal on August 17, 2016.

Career statistics

References

External links

1989 births
Hershey Bears players
Ice hockey players from New Jersey
Living people
Los Angeles Kings draft picks
Manchester Monarchs (AHL) players
Manchester Monarchs (ECHL) players
Owen Sound Attack players
People from Livingston, New Jersey
Providence Bruins players
Sportspeople from Essex County, New Jersey
Tappara players
Toronto Marlies players
USA Hockey National Team Development Program players
American men's ice hockey defensemen